Tiktiqucha (Quechua tikti wart, qucha lake, lagoon, "wart lake", hispanicized spelling Ticticocha) is a lake in Peru located in the Lima Region, Huarochirí Province, Chicla District. Tiktiqucha lies near the Antikuna mountain pass, southwest of a lake named Waqraqucha and southeast of the peak of  Tikti Mach'ay.

See also
 Nor Yauyos-Cochas Landscape Reserve
List of lakes in Peru

References

Lakes of Peru
Lakes of Lima Region